Aryabhata was India's first satellite, named after the famous Indian astronomer. It was launched on 19 April 1975 from Kapustin Yar, a Soviet rocket launch and development site in Astrakhan Oblast using a Kosmos-3M launch vehicle. It was built by ISRO, and launched by the Soviet union as a part of the Soviet Interkosmos programme which provided access to space for friendly states.

Launch
It was launched by India on 19 April 1975 from Kapustin Yar, a Russian rocket launch and development site in Astrakhan Oblast using a Kosmos-3M launch vehicle. It was built by the Indian Space Research Organisation (ISRO).The launch came from an agreement between India and the Soviet Union directed by UR Rao and signed in 1972. It allowed the USSR to use Indian ports for tracking ships and launching vessels in return for launching various different Indian satellites.

It was built to conduct experiments in X-ray astronomy, aeronomics, and solar physics. The spacecraft was a 26-sided polyhedron  in diameter. All faces (except the top and bottom) were covered with solar cells. A power failure halted experiments after four days and 60 orbits with all signals from the spacecraft lost after five days of operation. Spacecraft mainframe remained active till March 1981. Due to orbital decay the satellite entered Earth's atmosphere on 10 February 1992.

Legacy

It was named after the 5th century astronomer and mathematician from India by Aryabhata.
 The satellite's image appeared on the reverse of Indian two rupee banknotes between 1976 and 1997 (Pick catalog).

See also

 Timeline of artificial satellites and space probes

References

External links

 Aryabhata-1 Official ISRO Website 
 NASA HEASARC Page.
 Astronautix Page
 India in Space Page
 NSSDC Master Catalog Search

Spacecraft which reentered in 1992
1975 in the Soviet Union
1975 in India
India–Soviet Union relations
First artificial satellites of a country
Satellites of India
Spacecraft launched in 1975